Android 13 is the thirteenth major release of the Android mobile operating system, developed by Google, released for the public on August 15, 2022.

History 

Android 13 (internally codenamed Tiramisu) was announced in an Android blog posted on February 10, 2022, and the first Developer Preview was immediately released for the Google Pixel series (from Pixel 4 to Pixel 6, dropping support for the Pixel 3 and Pixel 3a). It was released 4 months or so after the stable version of Android 12. Developer Preview 2 followed later, releasing in March. Beta 1 was released on April 26, 2022. Google released beta 2 during Google I/O on May 11, 2022. Two more beta versions were planned for release in June and July. Platform stability was reached in June, with Beta 3. The final release of Android 13 began on August 15 when the update was made available to Pixel phones and pushed to the Android Open Source Project.

Features

Privacy 
Android 13 includes several new features intended to enhance user privacy, both user-facing and developer-facing.

A new media picker is added, which improves privacy by allowing users to choose which photos and videos apps have access to. Most apps have not implemented this picker yet. In addition, Android 13 introduces a new permission, NEARBY_WIFI_DEVICES. Previously, Wi-Fi and GPS permissions were bundled into a single setting termed "Location". This change means that apps can now be allowed to search for nearby devices and networks without needing to request access to broader navigational systems.

Also, a new runtime permission feature is being added to apps sending non-exempt notifications which allows users to focus on notifications most important to them.

User experience 
Apps are now required to request permission from the user before they are able to send notifications.

Small changes to dialog windows such as the Internet toggle have been added, making them fit better with the design language. The media player has been redesigned, now using the album cover as a background, and including more user controls. The multiple users feature has been improved, with the added option of selecting which apps can be accessed by the guest user. App data is sandboxed for each user, so no information is shared.

New features 
The number of active apps is now shown at the bottom of the notifications panel, a tap on it opens a detailed panel which lets the user stop each of them.

Support for Bluetooth LE Audio and the LC3 audio codec, which enables receiving and sharing audio between multiple bluetooth devices simultaneously; it can also improve the audio quality and battery life of the connected devices, as long as they also support it. This version opens the support for third-party apps to use themed Material You icons. Long-pressing and dragging a notification will allow the notification to open in split screen view. This feature is available on phones as well as tablets.

As of Beta 2, the Pixel launcher includes a new "unified" search bar, which is able to provide search results from the internet as well as local apps and activities. It seems that Google will be expanding the capabilities of this search tool in future releases.

Per-app language preferences.

Tweaks 
Split Screen mode now persists through app changes, meaning it is possible to use other apps and the phone launcher, and split screen apps will stay paired together in the Overview menu. Animations have been improved, notably the fingerprint scanner glow on the Pixel 6 series. Overflow notifications on the lock screen also are housed in a dynamically sized pill rather than a bar, and the 2-line stacked clock is slightly smaller. The app label font has been changed in the Pixel Launcher, and subtle haptics have been added throughout the user experience.  The Android version has been changed to "Tiramisu" in settings and the Quick Settings panel. As of Developer Preview 2, "Tiramisu" is replaced with "13". The unified search bar includes new smoother animations and transitions.   

Many of the changes are from Android 12.1 "12L", such as the dock displayed on large screens, and other improvements for large format devices. These are mainly intended for foldables and tablets, but they can be enabled on phones by changing the DPI settings.

Platform 
Android 13 ART was updated with a new garbage collector (GC) utilizing the Linux userfaultfd system call. It reduces memory pressure, compiled code size, jank, and prevents the risk of killing apps because of low memory during GC. Other changes improve app startup and improve performance. Because of the Mainline project, Android 12 ART will also be updated.

See also 
 Android (operating system)
 Android version history

References

External Links 
 Android 13 - Official website for users
 Android 13 on Android Developers - Official website for developer information

Android (operating system)
2022 software